Homaliopsis is a genus of flowering plants belonging to the family Salicaceae.

Its native range is Madagascar.

Species:
 Homaliopsis forbesii S.Moore

References

Salicaceae
Salicaceae genera